The 8th European Badminton Championships were held in Böblingen, West Germany, between 13  and 18 April 1982, and hosted by the European Badminton Union and Deutscher Badminton-Verband e.V..

Medalists

Results

Semi-finals

Finals

Medal account

References

European Badminton Championships
European Badminton Championships
B
B
European Badminton Championships 1982
Badminton tournaments in Germany
20th century in Baden-Württemberg